The 2013 Provo Premier League was the 15th season of top-tier football in the Turks and Caicos Islands. It began on 2 February 2013 and ended on 6 April 2013.

League table

Results

References

Provo Premier League
Turks
Turks